North Fork Swannanoa River is a  long 3rd order tributary to the Swannanoa River in Buncombe County, North Carolina.

Course
North Fork Swannanoa River rises about 0.5 miles south of Walker Knob in Buncombe County on the Cane River divide.  The stream then flows south-southwest to meet the Swannanoa River at Grovestone, North Carolina.  It is impounded at Burnett Reservoir, which is part of the City of Asheville water supply.

Watershed
North Fork Swannanoa River drains  of area, receives about 55.62 in/year of precipitation, has a topographic wetness index of 272.84 and is about 89% forested.

References

Rivers of North Carolina
Bodies of water of Buncombe County, North Carolina